"My Strongest Weakness" is a song written by Naomi Judd and Mike Reid, and recorded by American country music artist Wynonna.  It was released in December 1992 as the fourth and final single from Wynonna's self-titled debut album.  The song peaked at number 4 on the Billboard Hot Country Singles & Tracks (now Hot Country Songs) charts.

Personnel
The following musicians performed on this track:
Eddie Bayers – drums
Wynonna Judd – lead vocals
Steve Nathan – keyboards
Don Potter – acoustic guitar
Matt Rollings – keyboards
Steuart Smith – electric guitar
Willie Weeks – bass guitar

Chart performance

Year-end charts

References

1992 singles
Wynonna Judd songs
Songs written by Mike Reid (singer)
Song recordings produced by Tony Brown (record producer)
MCA Records singles
Curb Records singles
Songs written by Naomi Judd
1992 songs